June Nash (January 26, 1911 - October 8, 1979) was an American film actress.

Nash started her film career in Frank Capra's Say It with Sables in 1928. Later in her career, she appeared Francis X. Bushman pictured in an embrace on lobby card for a film. In 1929, Nash played the lead role of "Ruth" in the mystery film Strange Cargo. She retired her career, as last appearing in the film Two Kinds of Women, in 1932.

Nash died in October 1979 in Hampton Bays, New York, at the age of 68.

Filmography

Film

References

External links 

Rotten Tomatoes profile

American film actresses
1911 births
1979 deaths
Actresses from New York (state)